The 2014–15 ISU Short Track Speed Skating World Cup was a multi-race tournament over a season for short track speed skating. The season began on 7 November 2014 and ended on 15 February 2015. The World Cup was organised by the ISU who also ran world cups and championships in speed skating and figure skating. In a break from normal tradition, the 4th leg of the world cup, held in Seoul, included a 3000m individual event for both the Men and Women.

Calendar

Men

Salt Lake City 7–9 November 2014

Montreal 14–16 November 2014

Shanghai 12–14 December 2014

Seoul 19–21 December 2014

Dresden 6–8 February 2015

Erzurum 13–15 February 2015

Women

Salt Lake City 7–9 November 2014

Montreal 14–16 November 2014

Shanghai 12–14 December 2014

Seoul 19–21 December 2014

Dresden 6–8 February 2015

Erzurum 13–15 February 2015

World Cup standings

See also
 2015 World Short Track Speed Skating Championships

Notes

References

External links 
 ISU.org World Cup Schedule
 Officlai results

ISU Short Track Speed Skating World Cup
Isu Short Track Speed Skating World Cup, 2014-15
Isu Short Track Speed Skating World Cup, 2014-15